The Downs' process is an electrochemical method for the commercial preparation of metallic magnesium, in which molten MgCl2 is electrolyzed in a special apparatus called the Downs cell.  The Downs cell was invented in 1922 (patented: 1924) by the American chemist James Cloyd Downs (1885–1957).

Operation
The Downs cell uses a carbon anode and an iron cathode. The electrolyte is magnesium chloride that has been heated to the liquid state. Although solid magnesium chloride is a poor conductor of electricity, when molten the magnesium and chloride ions are mobilized, which become charge carriers and allow conduction of electric current.

Some calcium chloride and/or chlorides  of barium (BaCl2) and strontium (SrCl2), and, in some processes, magnesium fluoride (MgF2) are added to the electrolyte to reduce the temperature required to keep the electrolyte liquid. Sodium chloride (NaCl) melts at 801 °C (1074 Kelvin), but a salt mixture can be kept liquid at a temperature as low as 600 °C at the mixture containing, by weight: 33.2% MgCl2 and 66.8% CaCl2. If pure magnesium chloride is used, a metallic magnesium emulsion is formed in the molten MgCl which is impossible to separate.  Therefore, one option is to have a MgCl2 (42%) and CaCl2 (58%) mixture.

The anode reaction is:

 2Cl− → Cl2 (g) + 2e−

The cathode reaction is:
 Mg2+ + 2e− → Mg (l)

for an overall reaction of

 Mg2+ + 2Cl− → Mg (l) + Cl2 (g)

The calcium does not enter into the reaction because its reduction potential of -2.87 volts is lower than that of magnesium, which is -2.38 volts. Hence the magnesium ions are reduced to metallic form in preference to those of calcium. If the electrolyte contained only calcium ions and no magnesium, calcium metal would be produced as the cathode product (which indeed is how metallic calcium is produced).

Both the products of the electrolysis, magnesium metal and chlorine gas, are less dense than the electrolyte and therefore float to the surface. Perforated iron baffles are arranged in the cell to direct the products into separate chambers without their ever coming into contact with each other.

Although theory predicts that a potential of a little over 4.07 volts should be sufficient to cause the reaction to go forward, in practice potentials of up to 8 volts are used. This is done in order to achieve useful current densities in the electrolyte despite its inherent electrical resistance. The overvoltage and consequent resistive heating contributes to the heat required to keep the electrolyte in a liquid state.

The Downs' process also produces chlorine as a byproduct, although chlorine produced this way accounts for only a small fraction of chlorine produced industrially by other methods.

References

Chemical processes
Electrolytic cells
Metallurgical processes